The Long March 4C, also known as the Chang Zheng 4C, CZ-4C and LM-4C, previously designated Long March 4B-II, is a Chinese orbital launch vehicle. It is launched from the Jiuquan, Taiyuan, and Xichang Satellite Launch Centers, and consists of 3 stages. Long March 4C vehicles have been used to launch the Yaogan-1, Yaogan-3 synthetic-aperture radar (SAR) satellites and the Fengyun-3A polar orbiting meteorological satellite. On 15 December 2009, a Long March 4C was used to launch Yaogan-8.

Because it was still designated as Long March 4B-II at the time of its maiden flight, the first launch is often mistaken for a Long March 4B. The Long March 4C is derived from the Long March 4B, but features a restartable upper stage, and a larger payload fairing.

On 1 September 2016, the Long March 4C failed for reasons not yet known. A Long March 4C rocket blasted off from the Taiyuan Satellite Launch Center in Shanxi but failed to insert its payload, the Gaofen 10 satellite, into its designated orbit.

Launch Statistics

List of launches

See also
 Long March 4B
 Long March (rocket family)
 Medium-lift launch vehicle

References

External links 
 CZ-4C Long March Space Launch Vehicle GlobalSecurity.org

Long March (rocket family)
Spacecraft launched in 2006
2006 in spaceflight
2006 in China
Vehicles introduced in 2006

de:Langer Marsch 4